Kurt Poletti (born 23 April 1960) is a Swiss bobsledder who competed in the early 1980s. He won two medals in the four-man event at the FIBT World Championships with a gold in 1983 and a silver in 1981.

Poletti also finished fourth in the four-man event at the 1984 Winter Olympics in Sarajevo.

References

External links
1984 bobsleigh four-man results
Bobsleigh four-man world championship medalists since 1930

Bobsledders at the 1984 Winter Olympics
Living people
Swiss male bobsledders
1960 births
Olympic bobsledders of Switzerland